Catrina Allen is an American professional disc golfer. She is a US Champion and 2 time World Champion, and has been ranked among the top four women in the world between 2012–2019.

In 2009, Allen was working as a bartender, and became interested in the sport after caddying for a friend at a tournament. She began playing and won the South Dakota Amateur Championships later that year, and won the US Women's Disc Golf Championship as an Amateur in 2010. Allen entered the professional tour in 2011, winning 15 events and the PDGA Female Rookie of the Year Award. In 2012, Allen became the second woman to win the PDGA Female Player of the Year Award the year after winning Rookie of the Year (Des Reading, 2001–2002). She has won five unique Majors, including the World Championships, and has won the Worlds Mixed Doubles Championships all three times she has competed (2011, 2012 with Paul Ulibarri; 2013 with Will Schusterick).

Professional career

As of August 2021, Catrina Allen has 171 career wins in the Open Female division.

Major wins

Majors playoff record (1-0)

National Tour wins

NT playoff record (3-1)

Disc Golf Pro Tour wins

Summary

Annual statistics

†At Year End
‡ Includes DGPT Championship (not PDGA sanctioned)

Equipment
Allen was sponsored by Prodigy Disc, and announced her departure late in 2021. While sponsored by Prodigy, she commonly carried the following discs:

Drivers
D1 (400)
D3 (400)
F3 (400)
F7 (400)

Midranges
M2 (300, 400)
M4 (400)

Putters
PA1 (300, 400)
PA4 (300)
P Model US (Ace Line)

Following the 2021 season, Catrina announced she would be sponsored by DGA.

References

American disc golfers
Living people
1985 births
People from Bellflower, California